"Steppin' Out with My Baby" is a popular song written by Irving Berlin and introduced in the 1948 musical film Easter Parade.  There it was sung by Fred Astaire as part of a dance number involving Astaire on stairs and three different dance partners.

Since then the song has been recorded and performed by several artists, most notably Tony Bennett, in whose treatment it has become a jazz standard.  Introduced as the title song on his 1993 Astaire-themed album Steppin' Out, a stylish music video for it garnered some MTV airplay and was part of Bennett's commercial resurgence at the time.    One such performance was included on his high-selling 1994 MTV Unplugged: Tony Bennett album. Later Bennett recorded it as bonus tracks duets with Michael Bublé and Delta Goodrem for his 2006 Duets: An American Classic album; performed it three times with Christina Aguilera on his NBC special An American Classic, Saturday Night Live, and the 59th Primetime Emmy Awards in 2007; and in 2011 with Haley Reinhart in the finale show of American Idol season 10. Aguilera and Bennett's version was nominated in 2008 50th Annual Grammy Awards in the category Best Pop Collaboration with Vocals. Bennett continued to perform the song until his retirement in 2021, at the age of 95.

Fred Astaire included the song on his album The Astaire Story (1952)
Doris Day recorded the song in 1959 for her "Cuttin' Capers" album.
Curtis Stigers, alongside the John Wilson Orchestra performed the song as the opening song for the film Ted 2.

It was also used as the ending song for the film She's Funny That Way (with footage "Easter Parade").

American swing revivalists the Cherry Poppin' Daddies recorded a version of the song on their 2016 cover album The Boop-A-Doo, alongside several other songs originally composed by Berlin.

References

1948 songs
2012 songs
Songs written by Irving Berlin
Tony Bennett songs
Fred Astaire songs
Christina Aguilera songs